Lady Be Careful is a 1936 American drama film directed by Theodore Reed and written by Dorothy Parker, Alan Campbell, and Harry Ruskin, adapted from the play by Kenyon Nicholson and Charles Knox Robinson. The film stars Lew Ayres, Mary Carlisle, Benny Baker, Buster Crabbe, Grant Withers, and Irving Bacon. The film was released on September 4, 1936, by Paramount Pictures.

Plot

Cast 
Lew Ayres as Chester aka Dynamite
Mary Carlisle as Billie 'Stonewall' Jackson
Benny Baker as Barney
Buster Crabbe as Jake 
Grant Withers as Lt. Loomis
Irving Bacon as Happy
Barbara Barondess as Dode
Sheila Bromley as Hazel
Wilma Francis as Bernice
Ethel Sykes as Dancer
Murray Alper as Mattie
Jack Chapin as Herb
Wesley Barry as Texas
Nick Lukats as Tim
Purnell Pratt as Father
Jack Adair as Sydney
Josephine McKim as Alice
Jennifer Gray as Girl in Sailboat
Bobbie Koshay as Girl in Sailboat 
Irene Bennett as Girl in Sailboat
Ellen Drew as Girl in Sailboat 
Louise Stanley as Girl in Sailboat

References

External links 
 

1936 films
Paramount Pictures films
American drama films
1936 drama films
Films directed by Theodore Reed
American black-and-white films
1930s English-language films
1930s American films